Yangon United Football Club is a Burmese football club, based at Yangon United Sports Complex, in Yangon, Myanmar. Owned by Tay Za, a prominent Burmese businessman, the club was one of eight teams that participated in the inaugural edition of the Myanmar National League in 2009, where they finished as runners-up. Yangon United's biggest rivals are Yadanarbon F.C., with whom they contest the Myanmar rivalry. However, due to Yadanarbon's decline, Yangon United's main rivals are now Shan United, in which now they contest in the new MNL derby.

History
Although Yangon United F.C. was officially founded in 2009, it started as the Air Bagan F.C side from the old Myanmar Premier League.

On 16 May 2009, Yangon United defeated Zeya Shwe Myay 4–0 in the league's second ever match to open the MNL Cup 2009. The club finished in second place in group play with 16 points. Yangon United lost to Yadanarbon in the final on penalty shootout after a 2–2 draw. During the 2010 season, Yangon United built an artificial turf football pitch and gymnasium. In 2011, Yangon United secured their first ever championship and also became champions of the 2011 Max Cement MFF Cup. This is the first time a team has won both the cup and the championship in the short history of the MNL. In 2012, the club won their second consecutive Myanmar National League title and qualified for the 2013 AFC Cup.

In 2010, Yangon United built their training ground and gymnasium. Yangon United Gymnasium is the first gym among the Myanmar National League clubs. In 2011, Yangon United won their first ever MNL championship. They also won 2011 Max Cement Cup. This is the first time a team has won both the cup and the championship in the short history of the MNL.

In 2012, Yangon United won their second MNL title.

In 2013, Yangon United signed with Grand Sport for kit sponsorship. The club won their third MNL championship in the same year. They played AFC Cup again and they passed to knock-out stage for the first time in club's history.

They would go on and dominate for long periods, until 2019, when they gave up the trophy to Shan United. They followed that up with an unconvincing 2020 Myanmar National League finishing 4th.

In the 2022 Myanmar National League season, they finished second place behind Shan United. Their top scorer was Valci who scored 8 goals in that season.

Players

2023 Final squad

Players' Records

All-time top scorers 

Figures for active players (in bold).

Continental record
All results (home and away) list Yangon United's goal tally first.

Honours

League
Myanmar National League
Winners (5): 2011, 2012, 2013, 2015, 2018}

Runners-up (4): 2014, 2016, 2017, 2022}

Cup
 General Aung San Shield
Winners (3): 2011, 2018, 2019}

Runners-up (2): 2016, 2017}

Cup
 Charity Cup winners
Winners (3): 2013,2016,2018}

Runners-up (3): 2012,2014,2019}

Coaching staff

|}

Statistics

Domestic

References

External links
Soccerway

 
Football clubs in Myanmar
Association football clubs established in 2009
Myanmar National League clubs
2009 establishments in Myanmar